Romanovo is a rural locality (a selo) and the administrative center of Romanovskoye Rural Settlement, Usolsky District, Perm Krai, Russia. The population was 759 as of 2010. There are 47 streets.

Geography 
Romanovo is located 55 km south of Usolye (the district's administrative centre) by road. Vogulka is the nearest rural locality.

References 

Rural localities in Perm Krai
Usolsky District, Perm Krai